Caroline Haffner is a musical performer.

Biography
She was born as Caroline Murat in Paris and studied piano with Alfred Cortot and Samson François, Pierre Sancan, and later with Lev Oborin in Moscow. She was awarded her Licence de Concert when she was 14 years old from the Ecole Normale de Musique de Paris. Caroline started a lifelong career as teacher and performer aged 18 in Paris. She was the youngest laureat at the Marguerite Long international competition, won the Grand Prix at the Genève International Competition and the Terni Casagrande among other prestigious prizes. She cofounded with Martin Engstroem the Verbier Academy. She is artistic director of the astonishing Gstaad New Year Music Festival https://gstaadnewyearmusicfestival.ch/, which started in 2013 and features international performers

References

External links
 http://www.gstaadnymf.com/Newsflash/Caroline-Haffner-in-Lauenen
 http://carolinemurat.com

21st-century French women classical pianists
Living people
1948 births
People from Neuilly-sur-Seine
École Normale de Musique de Paris alumni